was a Japanese actor and voice actor born in Tokyo. He is most remembered for being the first voice of Ramenman in Kinnikuman and for playing Vrlitwhai Kridanik in The Super Dimension Fortress Macross. He died in 1985 of a subarachnoid hemorrhage. After his death, Banjou Ginga replaced him as Ramenman.

Years later, Ryūzaburō Ōtomo would play Vrlitwhai Kridanik in the Macross and Super Robot Wars video games.

Filmography

Anime

External links
Official agency profile {{ja icon

1941 births
1985 deaths
Japanese male video game actors
Japanese male voice actors
Male voice actors from Tokyo
20th-century Japanese male actors
Aoni Production voice actors